Bandon railway station was on the Cork and Bandon Railway in County Cork, Ireland.

History
The station opened on 1 August 1849. It was rebuilt in 1894. There was a rail connection from the station to the nearby Allman's Bandon Distillery.

Regular passenger services were withdrawn on 1 April 1961.

References

Further reading 
 

Disused railway stations in County Cork
Railway stations opened in 1849
Railway stations closed in 1961
Bandon, County Cork
1849 establishments in Ireland
Railway stations in the Republic of Ireland opened in 1849